Anna Zeide is an American academic and author. She is an associate professor of history at Virginia Tech and writes on food, consumerism and food systems. She was previously at Oklahoma State University.

Early life and education 
Zeide was born on April 23, 1984 and raised in a rural and forested region of Arkansas. Her family were the only Jews in their town. The nearest synagogue was over two hours away in Little Rock, Arkansas. Zeide's father was a Russian-Jewish immigrant. She received a bachelor's degree and master's degree from Washington University in St. Louis and Doctor of Philosophy in History of Science, Medicine, and Technology from the University of Wisconsin-Madison.

Career 
After receiving her doctorate in 2014, Zeide became an assistant professor of history at Oklahoma State University–Stillwater and wrote on food, consumerism and food systems. She won a James Beard Award in the Reference, History, and Scholarship category for Canned: The Rise and Fall of Consumer Confidence in the American Food Industry. Zeide and her work has been featured on WORT, KPFA, BYU Radio, WYPR, KERA, and the New Books Network, and in the Review of Agricultural, Food and Environmental Studies, Stillwater News-Press and The O'Colly. Her work about botulism has been published in the Saturday Evening Post and Smithsonian.

In 2020, Zeide left Oklahoma to become an associate professor of history at Virginia Tech and the founding director of their Food Studies Program.

Selected works

Canned: The Rise and Fall of Consumer Confidence in the American Food Industry. Berkeley: University of California Press (2019).

References

External links

Her former blog

James Beard Foundation Award winners
Oklahoma State University faculty
Washington University in St. Louis alumni
University of Wisconsin–Madison alumni
1984 births
Living people
Academics from Arkansas
American people of Russian-Jewish descent
American writers of Russian descent
American women academics
21st-century American women writers
American women non-fiction writers
21st-century American non-fiction writers
Jewish women writers
Jewish non-fiction writers
Jewish American academics